Katherine Victoria Litwack (born June 13, 1986), known professionally as Kat Dennings, is an American actress. She is known for her starring roles as Max Black in the CBS sitcom 2 Broke Girls (2011–2017) and as Darcy Lewis in the Marvel Cinematic Universe superhero films Thor (2011), Thor: The Dark World (2013), Thor: Love and Thunder (2022), and the Disney+ miniseries WandaVision (2021).

Since making her acting debut in 2000, Dennings has appeared in films including The 40-Year-Old Virgin (2005), Big Momma's House 2 (2006), Charlie Bartlett (2007), The House Bunny (2008), Nick and Norah's Infinite Playlist (2008), Defendor (2009), and Suburban Gothic (2014).

Early life
Katherine Victoria Litwack was born on June 13, 1986, in Bryn Mawr, Pennsylvania. Her mother, Ellen Judith Litwack, is a poet and speech therapist, and her father, Gerald J. Litwack, is a molecular pharmacologist, and college professor and chairman. Dennings is the youngest of five children. Her family is Jewish. Dennings grew up in Penn Cottage, a historic house built in 1694 in Wynnewood, Pennsylvania, which she claims was haunted.

Beginning her career at age 9 by acting in commercials, Dennings said her family never had much money for formal acting training. Her first acting job was an advertisement for potato chips that included a poisonous ingredient and never made it to market. In her early years, she worked as an extra to earn her SAG card.

Dennings was homeschooled; her only enrollment at a traditional school was for a half-day at Friends' Central School. She graduated from high school early at age 14, and moved with her family to Los Angeles to pursue acting full time under the professional surname "Dennings".

Career

2000–2003: Early career
Dennings made her professional debut with an appearance on HBO's Sex and the City in 2000, in the episode "Hot Child in the City", playing an obnoxious 13-year-old who hires Samantha to handle publicity for her bat mitzvah. She then starred on the short-lived WB sitcom Raising Dad from 2001 to 2002 as Sarah, a 15-year-old raised by her widowed father (Bob Saget), with a pre-teen sister (Brie Larson). In 2002, Dennings appeared in the Disney Channel film The Scream Team as a teenager who stumbles into a group of ghosts. She was cast for a five-episode run on The WB's Everwood, but the role was recast with Nora Zehetner.

2004–2011: Feature film debut and further roles

Dennings continued working on television, guest-starring on Without a Trace as a teen whose boyfriend goes missing, and on Less than Perfect in 2003. In February 2004, she was cast in a pilot for CBS titled Sudbury, about a family of modern-day witches, based on the 1998 film Practical Magic, but the series was not picked up. Dennings had a recurring role on ER from 2005 to 2006 as Zoe Butler, and twice guest-starred in the CSI franchise: first on CSI, as Missy Wilson in the 2004 episode "Early Rollout". Secondly, she played Sarah Endecott on CSI: NY, in the 2005 episode "Manhattan Manhunt".

Dennings made her feature film debut in Hilary Duff's Raise Your Voice in 2004 as Sloane, a somber piano student. In 2005, she landed supporting roles as the daughter of Catherine Keener's character in The 40-Year-Old Virgin and as April in Down in the Valley. In 2006, Dennings played a rebellious teenager in the crime comedy film Big Momma's House 2, starring Martin Lawrence.

Dennings starred in Charlie Bartlett in 2008, the story of a wealthy teenager (Anton Yelchin) who acts as a psychiatrist among students at his new public high school. She played Susan Gardner, Bartlett's love interest and the daughter of the school's Principal Gardner, played by Robert Downey, Jr.. Dennings appeared in The House Bunny that year, as Mona, a pierced feminist sorority girl.

She also starred that year in the teen comedy romance Nick and Norah's Infinite Playlist, with Michael Cera. Dennings played Norah Silverberg, the daughter of a famous record producer. She was nominated for the International Press Academy's Satellite Award for Best Actress for her performance.

In September 2008, Dennings was involved in a project to adapt Don DeLillo's novel End Zone as a film. Actors Sam Rockwell and Josh Hartnett were also involved, but the project was not greenlit because of its subject matter of nuclear war was considered too controversial.

In 2009, Dennings appeared in The Answer Man, a film about a celebrity author whose manifestos become a sort of new Bible. She also co-starred in the Robert Rodriguez-directed dark children's film Shorts that year. She played Stacey Thompson, the teenage older sister of the protagonist Toe (Jimmy Bennett).

Dennings and other rising stars were featured in the August 2009 issue of Vanity Fair, photographed re-enacting scenes from famous Depression-era films. She was shown in a setting from Sydney Pollack's They Shoot Horses, Don't They? (1969).

Dennings was cast in the romantic comedy film Liars (A to E), to be directed by Richard Linklater. But the project was cancelled due to cutbacks at Miramax Films by the studio's parent company, Disney. Dennings appeared in the superhero film Defendor in 2009, starring Woody Harrelson and Sandra Oh, playing a crack-addicted prostitute.

The following year, she starred in the independent feature Daydream Nation, as a girl who moves from the city to a strange rural town, and is caught in a love triangle with her high school teacher (Josh Lucas) and a teenage drug dealer (Reece Thompson). The film began shooting in Vancouver in early 2010, and was written and directed by Michael Golbach. In May 2010, Dennings appeared in a music video for "40 Dogs (Like Romeo and Juliet)", a single by Austin, Texas-based musician Bob Schneider. Robert Rodriguez directed the video, which was filmed in various locations around Austin.

Dennings was part of the cast of the Marvel Studios film Thor, released in May 2011, and directed by Kenneth Branagh. She played Darcy Lewis, a tech-savvy sidekick and assistant to Natalie Portman's character, Jane Foster. The film went into production in January 2010, and was shot in New Mexico for six weeks in early 2010.

2011–present: 2 Broke Girls and future projects

In February 2011, Dennings was cast in 2 Broke Girls, a CBS sitcom written and produced by Michael Patrick King and comedian Whitney Cummings. The series debuted on September 19, 2011, and follows the lives of two underemployed girls. Beth Behrs co-stars as a Manhattan heiress who lost her inheritance, while Dennings plays a tough outspoken girl from Brooklyn. Dennings liked the idea of reaching a wider audience with her work, so she accepted the role on the network sitcom. On May 12, 2017, CBS canceled the series after six seasons.

Dennings starred in the drama film To Write Love on Her Arms (originally titled Renee) in 2012, with Chad Michael Murray and Rupert Friend. She played Renee Yohe, a Florida teenager who struggled with substance abuse and self-injury, and who inspired the founding of the nonprofit organization To Write Love on Her Arms. The film began production in Orlando, Florida, in February 2011.

In mid-2012, Dennings filmed the independent feature Suburban Gothic, playing a small-town bartender. The film premiered in 2014.

Dennings introduced The Black Keys at the 55th Grammy Awards on February 10, 2013. She appeared in a music video for the Hanson single "Get the Girl Back", alongside Nikki Reed. The actresses are close friends and are both fans of the pop group.

The video premiered on April 4, 2013. In 2013, Dennings reprised her role as Darcy Lewis in Thor: The Dark World. She worked on the film and 2 Broke Girls at the same time, flying to London to film for six months between breaks on her CBS sitcom.

In 2018, it was announced that Dennings would star as Abby in the comedy film Friendsgiving.

Dennings starred in the Hulu comedy series Dollface, beginning in November 2019. She reprised her role as Darcy Lewis in the Disney+ miniseries WandaVision (2021), and in Thor: Love and Thunder (2022).

Personal life
In 2008, Dennings stated that Judaism "is an important part of my history, but, as a whole, religion is not a part of my life." She considers herself more ethnically and culturally affiliated than religiously so.

From 2001 to 2010, Dennings maintained a blog, and also dabbled in video blogging on YouTube.

Dennings lives in Los Angeles with her cat, Millie. She is an animal welfare supporter.

Relationships 
From 2011 to 2014, Dennings dated her 2 Broke Girls co-star Nick Zano. From 2014 to 2016, Dennings dated singer Josh Groban.

On May 6, 2021, it was confirmed that Dennings was in a relationship with musician Andrew W.K.; the two met in Los Angeles earlier that year. A week later, on May 13, 2021, the couple announced their engagement on Instagram. Dennings has been a fan of W.K. since at least 2014.

Filmography

Film

Television

Music video

Audiobooks

Awards and nominations

References

External links

 
 

1986 births
21st-century American actresses
Actresses from Philadelphia
American child actresses
American film actresses
American television actresses
American voice actresses
Jewish American actresses
Living people
People from Bryn Mawr, Pennsylvania
21st-century American Jews